Sir Augustus Frederick William Keppel Stephenson,  (18 October 1827 in London – 26 September 1904) was a Treasury Solicitor and the second person to hold the office of Director of Public Prosecutions in England and Wales.

Early life and family
Stephenson was born in London on 18 October 1827, the eldest child of Henry Frederick Stephenson, M.P., and Lady Mary Keppel. His mother was one of eleven children born to William Keppel, 4th Earl of Albemarle. His father, Henry Frederick Stephenson, was the illegitimate son of Charles Howard, 11th Duke of Norfolk. Henry Frederick Stephenson was a barrister-at-law and served as M.P. for Westbury (1831–49).

His younger brother, Admiral Sir Henry Frederick Stephenson, was a Royal Navy officer, courtier and Arctic explorer.

Education
Stephenson was educated privately, and later attended Caius College, Cambridge, taking his M.A. in 1819. He was called to the Bar as barrister-at-law of Lincoln's Inn in 1852.

Career
For two years (1852–1854) he was Marshal and Associate in the Court of the Queen's Bench to the Lord Chief Justice. Stephenson then went to the Norfolk Circuit and was appointed a Revising Barrister and a Recorder of Bedford. He was appointed Assistant Solicitor of the Treasury by Lord Russell in 1865. The Chancellor of the Exchequer, Mr. Lowe, made him interim Registrar of Friendly Societies that same year.

In 1876 Stephenson was appointed Solicitor to the Treasury. The following year, the First Lord of the Treasury appointed him to serve as Her Majesty's Procurator General.

Stephenson was created a CB on the recommendation of Mr. Gladstone in 1883, and a KCB, in 1886. He was made Director of Public Prosecutions in 1884.

In 1889, he was made Queen's Counsel on the recommendation of Lord Chancellor Halsbury.

Marriage
Stephenson married Eglantine Pleydell-Bouverie, second daughter of Rt. Hon. Edward Pleydell-Bouverie and Elizabeth Anne Balfour, on 5 December 1864. Their children included Guy Stephenson.

Cleveland street scandal
One notable case occurred in 1889 when Stephenson was given the Cleveland Street scandal to prosecute. It involved various members of the aristocracy (such as Lord Arthur Somerset and the Earl of Euston), but these people were "allowed" (in the words of the radical journal the North London Press) to escape prosecution, something which attracted Stephenson a lot of criticism from the press.

References

1904 deaths
British barristers
Directors of Public Prosecutions (England and Wales)
Knights Commander of the Order of the Bath
Lawyers awarded knighthoods
1827 births
Alumni of Gonville and Caius College, Cambridge
English King's Counsel
Members of Lincoln's Inn
19th-century English lawyers
Treasury Solicitors